Lukáš Babač (born 20 March 1985) is a Slovak rower.

Born in Piešťany, Slovakia, he started to row at age 12. After 4th place at the World Rowing Junior Championships he qualified for 2004 Olympic Games. At the 2004 he was the youngest member of the Slovak Olympic Team. His best result was silver medal at the World Rowing Championships in 2010 in New Zealand.
He also has a silver medal form World Rowing U23 Championships in 2005, 2 silver medals from European Rowing Championships and he is an Academic World Champion, all in LM1x (lightweight men's single sculls). He won 2 FISA World cup races in Bled and Lucern 2015. In 2016 Babač become the European Champion at the   European Rowing Championships in Brandenburg.
His coach is Dr. Vaclav Kacíř.

References

External links
 
 
 

1985 births
Living people
Slovak male rowers
Sportspeople from Piešťany
Rowers at the 2004 Summer Olympics
Olympic rowers of Slovakia
World Rowing Championships medalists for Slovakia
European Rowing Championships medalists